The South Wales Scorpions, known as the South Wales Ironmen in 2017, were a semi-professional rugby league club based in South Wales. They played in the third tier of the British rugby league system (currently known as League 1) between 2010 and 2017. The team initially played at The Gnoll in Neath, before spells at Caerphilly, Mountain Ash, Maesteg, and Merthyr Tydfil.

Under new ownership, the club relocated to Llanelli effective immediately in July 2017. The following season, they began competing as West Wales Raiders.

History
In December 2009, South Wales RLFC was admitted into Championship One for the 2010 season. This followed the relocation of Super League club Crusaders RL from Bridgend to Wrexham. The Scorpions moniker was announced on 22 December.

Wales Rugby League agreed to take over the running of the Scorpions for the 2014 season after club owner Phil Davies decided to step down.

In 2014, the Scorpions played at Llynfi Road in Maesteg. The club relocated the following year, to Parc Dyffryn Pennar in Mountain Ash, which also served as a training ground. In 2016, the team played at Virginia Park in Caerphilly.

The club was renamed South Wales Ironmen for the 2017 season, coinciding with their move to The Wern, Merthyr Tydfil.

In July 2017, the club was bought by Andrew Thorne, owner of amateur club West Wales Raiders. The Scorpions began using Llanelli's Stebonheath Park as their home ground for the remainder of the season. The club were rebranded as the West Wales Raiders and remained in League 1 in 2018 - and, as such, the Raiders can be regarded as a continuation of the Ironmen club, and their previous incarnation the South Wales Scorpions.

Seasons

References

External links
 Wales Rugby League Website

 
Rugby league in Wales
Welsh rugby league teams
Sport in Neath
Sport in Llanelli
2009 establishments in Wales
2017 disestablishments in Wales
Rugby clubs established in 2009